Palgutta is a village and panchayat in Ranga Reddy district, Telangana, India. It falls under Chevella mandal. It is a place where movie shootings take place. It is also covered with forest. The village is known for its scenic beauty of flowers in and around the village. It is the fastest growing village in the Ranga Reddy district located near to Shamshabad.

References

Villages in Ranga Reddy district